Ashrafabad (also Romanized as Ashrafābād and Ashrāfābād) is a village in Pachehlak-e Gharbi Rural District, in the Central District of Azna County, Lorestan Province, Iran. At the 2006 census, its population was 351, in 84 families.

References 

Towns and villages in Azna County